Erasure is the seventh studio album by English synth-pop album Erasure, released on 23 October 1995 by Mute Records. It was produced by Thomas Fehlmann (of The Orb) and Gareth Jones.

An overtly experimental and introspective album, Erasure contains 11 mostly mid-tempo tracks that differed from their past output of shiny, three-minute pop songs. Most tracks clocked in at five minutes or more, several contained long synth interludes, and guest artists included the London Community Gospel Choir and performance artist Diamanda Galás.

Although appreciated for its experimental nature, Erasure marked the beginning of Erasure's slide from the peak of their popularity in the mainstream music world.   Coming off four consecutive number-one albums in the UK, this album failed to hit the top 10, and two single releases also missed the UK top ten.  After a successful top 20 debut on the Billboard 200 for their previous album I Say I Say I Say, Erasure debuted and peaked at number 82 in the US and generated no Hot 100 singles. In Germany the album also peaked lower than previous albums, at number 87.

In an interview with DJ Ron Slomowicz circa 2006, Erasure was asked for their favourite album from their own catalogue. Bell stated "It's a toss-up between "Chorus" and the self-titled "Erasure" album from 1995."

Track listing

2016 "Erasure 30" 30th anniversary BMG reissue LP
Subsequent to their acquisition of Erasure's back catalog, and in anticipation of the band's 30th anniversary, BMG commissioned reissues of all previously released UK editions of Erasure albums up to and including 2007's Light at the End of the World. All titles were pressed and distributed by Play It Again Sam on 180-gram vinyl and shrinkwrapped with a custom anniversary sticker.

2022 Deluxe edition - extended edition 
In September 2022, Erasure announced the re-release of their self-titled 7th album in a special hardback book edition, with a bonus CD of remixes, release date of 17 November 2020 through Mute/BMG records.

Deluxe CD 2 Track Listing
source: Classic Pop Magazine

Personnel
 Andy Bell – vocals
 Vince Clarke – synthesizers, programming
 Diamanda Galás – vocals
 Paul Hickey – background vocals
 Ruby James – background vocals
 London Community Gospel Choir – choir, chorus

Production
 Dave Bascombe – mixing
 Blaise Dupuy – engineer
 Thomas Fehlmann – producer
 George Holt – engineer
 Ian Huffam – mixing assistant
 Gareth Jones – producer
 François Kevorkian – mixing
 Mike Marsh – mastering
 Patrick McGovern – mixing assistant
 Ashley Potter – illustrations
 Lloyd Puckitt – mixing
 Sly Smith – artwork
 Andy Strange – mixing assistant

Charts

Certifications

References

1995 albums
Albums produced by Gareth Jones (music producer)
Elektra Records albums
Erasure albums
Mute Records albums